Rothwell is an electoral ward of Leeds City Council in south east Leeds, West Yorkshire, including the town of the same name and the villages of Carlton, Oulton and Woodlesford.

Councillors 

 indicates seat up for re-election.
 indicates councillor vacancy.
* indicates incumbent councillor.

Elections since 2010

May 2022

May 2021

May 2019

May 2018

May 2016

May 2015

May 2014

May 2012

May 2011

May 2010

See also
Listed buildings in Rothwell, West Yorkshire

Notes

References

Places in Leeds
Wards of Leeds
Rothwell, West Yorkshire